Madan Kumari Shah "Garima"  a current secretary of CPN (Unified Socialist). She is also member of Rastriya Sabha and was elected from 2022 Nepalese National Assembly election. Shah is also in charge of Sudurpashchim Province committee of the party.

References 

Year of birth missing (living people)
Living people
Communist Party of Nepal (Unified Socialist) politicians
Members of the National Assembly (Nepal)